Australia was represented in archery at the first 1960 Summer Paralympic Games. Three athletes - Ross Sutton, Tony South and Alan Conn have won gold medals. Australia has won medals at six Games.

Medal tally

Summer Paralympic Games

1960

Australia represented by: 
Men - Frank Ponta, Ross Sutton,  Robin Tourier  
Women Daphne Ceeney (now Hilton) 
Ross Sutton won a gold medal and Daphne Ceeney a silver medal.

1964

Australia represented by: 
Men - Lionel Cousens, Roy Fowler, John Martin 
Women - Daphne Ceeney   
Roy Fowler won two silver medals and Lionel Cousens and John Martin won a silver medal.

1968

Australia represented by: 
Men - Kevin Bawden, Fred Blums,  Alan Conn, Roy Fowler, Allan McLucas, Tony South    
Women - Pam Smith, Di Workman  
Tony South won a gold and silver medal. Allan Conn won a gold medal. Allan McLucas won a silver medal.

1972

Australia represented by: 
Men - Alan Conn, Dwyer, Roy Fowler, Eric Magennis, Terry Mason, Victor Salvemini, Tony South 
Women - Margaret Ross, Pam Smith    
Roy Fowler won a silver and bronze medal. Tony South and Alan Conn won bronze medals.

1976

Australia represented by: 
Men – Wayne Flood, Roy Fowler, Jeff Heath, Ross Soutar 
Women – Charmaine McLean, Elizabeth Richards, Margaret Ross  Australia did not win any medals.

1980

Australia represented by: 
Men  -  Dennis Kennedy, Eric Klein, Ian Trewhella 
Women – Susan Davies    
Ian Trewhella won a silver medal.

1984

Australia represented by: 
Men – Stephen Austen, David Higgins, Eric Klein, Russell Schinn, Ian Trewhella  
Women – Susan Davies   
Australia won two silver and one bronze medal. Ian Trewhella won two silver medals, Stephen Austen and David Higgins won silver medal and Susan Davies won a bronze.

1988

Australia represented by: 
Men – Arthur Fisk, Eric Klein 
Women – Carolyn Burns  
Australia did not win any medals.

1992

Australia represented by: 
Men – Arthur Fisk, Eric Klein   
Australia did not win any medals.

1996
No athletes

2000

Australia represented in archery by:

Men - Arthur Fisk, John Marshall, Tony Marturano 
Women - Natalie Cordowiner 
Coaches - Robert de Bondt (Head), Hans Klar  
Australia failed to win any medals.

2004

Australia represented in archery: 
Women - Natalie Cordowiner 
Officials - Vicki O'Brien (Manager)
 
Australia's sole competitor did not win a medal.

2008
No athletes

2012
No athletes

2016 

Australia represented in archery by:

Men – Jonathon Milne 
Head Coach/ Team Leader - Ricci Cheah
  
Milne won Australia first archery medal since 1984 by winning the bronze medal in Compound Individual W2.

See also
Archery at the Summer Paralympics
Australia at the Paralympics

References

Paralympic archers of Australia
Australian Paralympic teams
Archery in Australia